Gaye Cooley (born July 6, 1946 in North Bay, Ontario) is a Canadian former ice hockey goaltender.

Gaye Cooley played college hockey at Michigan State University. He was named as the Most Valuable Player of the 1966 NCAA Division I Men's Ice Hockey Tournament, which was won by Michigan State. After leaving Michigan State in 1967, Cooley began his professional career in the Eastern Hockey League with the Knoxville Knights and then moved to the International Hockey League with the Port Huron Flags and the Des Moines Oak Leafs. Cooley returned to the EHL with the Charlotte Checkers before moving to the American Hockey League's Rochester Americans but after one season he returned to the Checkers who were now playing in the Southern Hockey League, one of two leagues formed after the EHL folded.  After three seasons, he moved to the Philadelphia Firebirds of the North American Hockey League, the other league formed from the EHL's closure, and then the New England Whalers of the World Hockey Association before finishing his career with one more season with the Checkers.

Cooley played just three seconds of major-league hockey, coming on as a substitute for Cap Raeder in a WHA playoff game on May 11, 1976 against the Houston Aeros.

Awards and honors

References

External links

1946 births
Canadian ice hockey goaltenders
Charlotte Checkers (EHL) players
Charlotte Checkers (SHL) players
Des Moines Oak Leafs players
Ice hockey people from Ontario
Living people
Michigan Wolverines men's ice hockey players
New England Whalers players
Philadelphia Firebirds (NAHL) players
Port Huron Flags (IHL) players
Rochester Americans players
Sportspeople from North Bay, Ontario
NCAA men's ice hockey national champions